Samuel Louis Kaplan (born 1936) is an American diplomat who served as United States Ambassador to Morocco.  He was appointed ambassador in 2009 by President Barack Obama, replacing the previous ambassador Thomas T. Riley. He is one of only a few American Jews to represent the United States in a Muslim nation.

Before entering the diplomatic service, Ambassador Kaplan was a well-known business and community leader in Minneapolis, where he headed a law firm that he founded in 1978.  Ambassador Kaplan attended the University of Minnesota where he earned both an undergraduate and a law degree, graduating magna cum laude, and where he served as President of the University of Minnesota Law Review.

Career
After law school graduation, Kaplan was an assistant professor of law and a guest speaker in law classes. Later, he founded Kaplan, Strangis and Kaplan, P.A, a law firm, in 1978.

References

External links

1936 births
Living people
20th-century American Jews
Minnesota lawyers
University of Minnesota alumni
University of Minnesota Law School alumni
Ambassadors of the United States to Morocco
21st-century American Jews